Moon Kyeong-Ha (born May 29, 1980) is a South Korean handball player who competed in the 2000 Summer Olympics, the 2004 Summer Olympics and the 2012 Summer Olympics.

In 2000, she was part of the South Korean team which finished fourth in the Olympic tournament. She played one match as goalkeeper.

Four years later she won the silver medal with the South Korean team. She played four matches including the final as goalkeeper.

Individual awards 
 Carpathian Trophy Best Goalkeeper: 2006

References

External links
Profile

1980 births
Living people
South Korean female handball players
Olympic handball players of South Korea
Handball players at the 2000 Summer Olympics
Handball players at the 2004 Summer Olympics
Handball players at the 2012 Summer Olympics
Olympic silver medalists for South Korea
Olympic medalists in handball
Medalists at the 2004 Summer Olympics
Asian Games medalists in handball
Handball players at the 2002 Asian Games
Handball players at the 2006 Asian Games
Handball players at the 2010 Asian Games
Asian Games gold medalists for South Korea
Asian Games bronze medalists for South Korea
Medalists at the 2002 Asian Games
Medalists at the 2006 Asian Games
Medalists at the 2010 Asian Games
21st-century South Korean women